Peter Charles Lovett (born 6 March 1950) is a retired British racing driver and businessman. He is perhaps best known for his racing exploits in the TWR run Rover SD1 in the early 1980s.

Racing career
Lovett's debut in racing was in 1976 driving a Porsche, and then contested sportscar endurance events. He competed five times at the Le Mans 24 Hour between 1978 and 1982, but failed to finish any of the events due to mechanical difficulties.

Lovett made the switch to saloon car racing and made his debut in the British Touring Car Championship driving a Triumph Dolomite, before being picked up by the factory Austin Rover team. The Rover SD1 was the class of the field and Lovett took several wins between 1981 and 84, winning his class in 1981, and then finishing runner up in class to his team mate Jeff Allam in 1982. In 1983 he was in contention for the title alongside his team mates Allam and Steve Soper. Soper just pipped him to the championship, but then the Rover team was disqualified from the results for technical infringements. As well as racing in Britain Lovett drove for TWR in Europe, driving in the ETCC and also contesting the Spa 24 Hours race alongside his regular team mates.

Lovett made his final appearance in the BTCC in 1986 before retiring from motorsport to concentrate solely on his business interests.

Later career
Lovett's father founded his first car dealership in 1966. When he retired, Peter became chairman of Dick Lovett Cars, and owns a string of car dealerships across the south of England, catering for marques such as Ferrari, Porsche, Aston Martin, Jaguar Land Rover, Mercedes Benz and BMW.

Racing record

Complete British Saloon Car Championship results
(key) (Races in bold indicate pole position; races in italics indicate fastest lap.)

† Events with 2 races staged for the different classes.

References

1950 births
British racing drivers
Living people